Ripistes is a genus of annelids belonging to the family Naididae.

The species of this genus are found in Eurasia and Northern America.

Species:
 Ripistes parasita (Schmidt, 1847)

References

Naididae